Nishir Daak was an  Indian Bengali-language supernatural television soap opera that premiered on 3 December 2018 and aired on Colors Bangla; it is also available on the digital platform Voot. The show was produced under the banner of Shree Venkatesh Films. The show stars Tumpa Ghosh and Shubhankar Saha (later replaced by Soumyo Banerjee) in lead roles, Sairity Banerjee (later replaced by Geetashree Roy) in a negative role, and Sukanya Chatterjee and Sandip in other prominent supporting roles.

Plot
The series involves Shreemoyee protecting her daughter Tara, who is in great danger.

Cast
Tumpa Ghosh as Shreemoyee: Rudra's wife, Tara's adoptive mother and Chaya's biological mother 
Shubhankar Saha/Shoumo Banerjee as Rudra: Shreemoyee's husband and Chaya's and Tara's father
Sairity Banerjee/Geetasree Roy as Nishi : a kind of Pishachini. (Deceased)( after  some years she knows as Mahanishi
Sukanya Chatterjee as Tara: Shreemoyee's child 
Sharmila Das as Rudra's aunt and Rudra's Father's and Mother's Sister in law.
Sandip Dey as Aghornathoo: Tara's biological father
Manishankar Banerjee as Rudra's Father and Shreemoyee's and Nishi's Father in Law. Tulshi's Husband
Piyali Basu as Guruma
Dola Chakraborty as Rudra's aunt aka Pishimoni
Tanushree Bhattacharya Bose as Rimjhim :Rudra's friend
Elfina Mukherjee as Rudra's Sister and Tulshi's Daughter.
Kanyakumari Mukherjee as The Goddes Maa kali.
Minakshi Ghosh as Tara's biological mother, Aghornath's wife
Srabanti Malakar as Sreemoyee's aunt
Tanushree Saha/Shakshi Roy as Rudra's sister, (Pishimoni's daughter)
Sreeja Kirti as Damori/Nishi's daughter
Moumita Gupta as Tulsi, Shreemoyee's mother-in law.
Maffin Chakraborty as Pisimoni: Roha Naggin
Chandrayee Ghosh as jorasondhi: pishachini
Nilotpal Banerjee as Siddhartha: Rudra's friend 
Siddhartha Shankar Chakroborty as Nishi's Husband. Tulshi's Second Son. Damori's Father. (Deceased)
Chaitali Chakroborty as Nishi's Mother / guruma. (Daini)

References

2018 Indian television series debuts
Indian drama television series
Colors Bangla original programming